The Outer Space Treaty, formally the Treaty on Principles Governing the Activities of States in the Exploration and Use of Outer Space, including the Moon and Other Celestial Bodies, is a multilateral treaty that forms the basis of international space law. Negotiated and drafted under the auspices of the United Nations, it was opened for signature in the United States, the United Kingdom, and the Soviet Union on 27 January 1967, entering into force on 10 October 1967. , 113 countries are parties to the treaty—including all major spacefaring nations—and another 23 are signatories.

The Outer Space Treaty was spurred by the development of intercontinental ballistic missiles (ICBMs) in the 1950s, which could reach targets through outer space. The Soviet Union's launch of Sputnik, the first artificial satellite, in October 1957, followed by a subsequent arms race with the United States, hastened proposals to prohibit the use of outer space for military purposes. On 17 October 1963, the U.N. General Assembly unanimously adopted a resolution prohibiting the introduction of weapons of mass destruction in outer space. Various proposals for an arms control treaty governing outer space were debated during a General Assembly session in December 1966, culminating in the drafting and adoption of the Outer Space Treaty the following January.

Key provisions of the Outer Space Treaty include prohibiting nuclear weapons in space; limiting the use of the Moon and all other celestial bodies to peaceful purposes; establishing that space shall be freely explored and used by all nations; and precluding any country from claiming sovereignty over outer space or any celestial body. Although it forbids establishing military bases, testing weapons and conducting military maneuvers on celestial bodies, the treaty does not expressly ban all military activities in space, nor the establishment of military space forces or the placement of conventional weapons in space. 
From 1968 to 1984, the OST birthed four additional agreements: rules for activities on the Moon; liability for damages caused by spacecraft; the safe return of fallen astronauts; and the registration of space vehicles.

OST provided many practical uses and was the most important link in the chain of international legal arrangements for space from the late 1950s to the mid-1980s. OST was at the heart of a 'network' of inter-state treaties and strategic power negotiations to achieve the best available conditions for nuclear weapons world security. The OST also declares that space is an area for free use and exploration by all and "shall be the province of all mankind". Drawing heavily from the Antarctic Treaty of 1961, the Outer Space Treaty likewise focuses on regulating certain activities and preventing unrestricted competition that could lead to conflict. Consequently, it is largely silent or ambiguous on newly developed space activities such as lunar and asteroid mining. Nevertheless, the Outer Space Treaty is the first and most foundational legal instrument of space law, and its broader principles of promoting the civil and peaceful use of space continue to underpin multilateral initiatives in space, such as the International Space Station and the Artemis Program.

Provisions

The Outer Space Treaty represents the basic legal framework of international space law. According to the U.N. Office for Outer Space Affairs (UNOOSA), the core principles of the treaty are:

 the exploration and use of outer space shall be carried out for the benefit and in the interests of all countries and shall be the province of all mankind;
 outer space shall be free for exploration and use by all States;
 outer space is not subject to national appropriation by claim of sovereignty, by means of use or occupation, or by any other means;
 States shall not place nuclear weapons or other weapons of mass destruction in orbit or on celestial bodies or station them in outer space in any other manner;
 the Moon and other celestial bodies shall be used exclusively for peaceful purposes;
 astronauts shall be regarded as the envoys of mankind;
 States shall be responsible for national space activities whether carried out by governmental or non-governmental entities;
 States shall be liable for damage caused by their space objects; and
 States shall avoid harmful contamination of space and celestial bodies.

Among its principles, it bars states party to the treaty from placing weapons of mass destruction in Earth orbit, installing them on the Moon or any other celestial body, or otherwise stationing them in outer space. It specifically limits the use of the Moon and other celestial bodies to peaceful purposes, and expressly prohibits their use for testing weapons of any kind, conducting military maneuvers, or establishing military bases, installations, and fortifications (Article IV). However, the treaty does not prohibit the placement of conventional weapons in orbit, and thus some highly destructive attack tactics, such as kinetic bombardment, are still potentially allowable. In addition, the treaty explicitly allows the use of military personnel and resources to support peaceful uses of space, mirroring a common practice permitted by the Antarctic Treaty regarding that continent. The treaty also states that the exploration of outer space shall be done to benefit all countries and that space shall be free for exploration and use by all the states.

Article II of the treaty explicitly forbids any government from claiming a celestial body such as the Moon or a planet as its own territory, whether by declaration, occupation, or "any other means". However, the state that launches a space object, such as a satellite or space station, retains jurisdiction and control over that object; by extension, a state is also liable for damages caused by its space object.

Responsibility for activities in space 
Article VI of the Outer Space Treaty deals with international responsibility, stating that "the activities of non-governmental entities in outer space, including the Moon and other celestial bodies, shall require authorization and continuing supervision by the appropriate State Party to the Treaty" and that States Party shall bear international responsibility for national space activities whether carried out by governmental or non-governmental entities.

As a result of discussions arising from Project West Ford in 1963, a consultation clause was included in Article IX of the Outer Space Treaty: "A State Party to the Treaty which has reason to believe that an activity or experiment planned by another State Party in outer space, including the Moon and other celestial bodies, would cause potentially harmful interference with activities in the peaceful exploration and use of outer space, including the Moon and other celestial bodies, may request consultation concerning the activity or experiment."

Applicability in the 21st century 
Being primarily an arms control treaty for the peaceful use of outer space, the Outer Space Treaty offers limited and ambiguous regulations to newer space activities such as lunar and asteroid mining. It is therefore debated whether the extraction of resources falls within the prohibitive language of appropriation, or whether the use of such resources encompasses the commercial use and exploitation. 

Seeking clearer guidelines, private U.S. companies lobbied the U.S. government, which in 2015 introduced the U.S. Commercial Space Launch Competitiveness Act of 2015 legalizing space mining. Similar national legislation to legalize the appropriation of extraterrestrial resources are now being introduced by other countries, including Luxembourg, Japan, China, India, and Russia. This has created some controversy regarding legal claims over the mining of celestial bodies for profit.

1976 Bogota Declaration
The "Declaration of the First Meeting of Equatorial Countries", also known as the "Bogota Declaration", was one of the few attempts to challenge the Outer Space Treaty. It was promulgated in 1976 by eight equatorial countries to assert sovereignty over those portions of the geostationary orbit that continuously lie over the signatory nations' territory. These claims did not receive wider international support or recognition, and were subsequently abandoned.

Influence on space law
As the first international legal instrument concerning space, the Outer Space Treaty is considered the "cornerstone" of space law. It was also the first major achievement of the United Nations in this area of law, following the adoption of the first U.N. General Assembly resolution on space in 1958, and the first meeting of the U.N. Committee on the Peaceful Uses of Outer Space (COPUOS) the subsequent year.

Within roughly a decade of the treaty's entry into force, several other treaties were brokered by the U.N. to further develop the legal framework for activities in space:
Rescue Agreement (1968)
Space Liability Convention (1972)
Registration Convention (1976)
Moon Treaty (1979)
With the exception of the Moon Treaty, to which only 18 nations are party, all other treaties on space law have been ratified by most major space-faring nations (namely those capable of orbital spaceflight). COPUOS coordinates these treaties and other questions of space jurisdiction, aided by the U.N. Office for Outer Space Affairs.

The Bogota Declaration tried to complement shortcomings of the treaty on safeguarding control of Earth's geostationary orbit, but was not implemented.

List of parties
The Outer Space Treaty was opened for signature in the United States, the United Kingdom, and the Soviet Union on 27 January 1967, and entered into force on 10 October 1967. As of March 2023, 113 countries are parties to the treaty, while another 23 have signed the treaty but have not completed ratification.

Multiple dates indicate the different days in which states submitted their signature or deposition, which varied by location: (L) for London, (M) for Moscow, and (W) for Washington, D.C. Also indicated is whether the state became a party by way of signature and subsequent ratification, by accession to the treaty after it had closed for signature, or by succession of states after separation from some other party to the treaty.

Partially recognized state abiding by treaty
When the PRC subsequently ratified the treaty, they described the Republic of China's (ROC) ratification as "illegal". The ROC has committed itself to continue to adhere to the requirements of the treaty, and the United States has declared that it still considers the ROC to be "bound by its obligations".

States that have signed but not ratified
Twenty-three states have signed but not ratified the treaty.

List of non-parties

The remaining UN member states and UN observer state which have neither ratified nor signed the Outer Space Treaty are:

See also

High-altitude nuclear explosion (HANE)
Kármán line
Lunar Flag Assembly
Common heritage of mankind
Human presence in space
Militarization of space
Moon Treaty
SPACE Act of 2015
Treaty on Open Skies
United Nations Convention on the Law of the Sea
 International waters
 International zone
 Extraterritorial jurisdiction
 Extraterritorial operation
 Extraterritoriality

References

Further reading 
 Annette Froehlich, et al.: A Fresh View on the Outer Space Treaty. Springer, Vienna 2018, .

External links
 International Institute of Space Law
 Full text of the "Treaty on Principles Governing the Activities of States in the Exploration and Use of Outer Space, including the Moon and Other Celestial Bodies" in Arabic, Chinese, English, French, Russian, or Spanish
 Status of International Agreements relating to Activities in Outer Space (list of state parties to treaty), UN Office for Outer Space Affairs
 "The Case for Withdrawing from the 1967 Outer Space Treaty"
 Still Relevant (and Important) After All These Years: The case for supporting the Outer Space Treaty
 Squadron Leader KK Nair's Space: The Frontiers of Modern Defence. Knowledge World Publishers, New Delhi, Chap. 5 "Examining Space Law...", pp. 84–104, available at Google Books.
 Introductory note by Vladimír Kopal, procedural history note and audiovisual material on the Treaty on Principles Governing the Activities of States in the Exploration and Use of Outer Space, including the Moon and Other Celestial Bodies in the Historic Archives of the United Nations Audiovisual Library of International Law
 The Progressive Development of International Space Law by the United Nations—Lecture by Vladimír Kopal] in the Lecture Series of the United Nations Audiovisual Library of International Law
 The Law of Outer Space in the General Legal Field (Commonalities and Particularities)—Lecture by Vladlen Stepanovich Vereshchetin in the Lecture Series of the United Nations Audiovisual Library of International Law
  Humans on Mars and beyond  full-text

Arms control treaties
Cold War treaties
Treaties of the Soviet Union
Soviet Union–United States relations
Treaties of the United States
Nuclear weapons policy
Space weapons
Space treaties
1967 in spaceflight
1967 in military history
Treaties establishing nuclear-weapon-free zones
Treaties concluded in 1967
Treaties entered into force in 1967
Treaties of the Democratic Republic of Afghanistan
Treaties of Antigua and Barbuda
Treaties of Argentina
Treaties of Australia
Treaties of Austria
Treaties of the Bahamas
Treaties of Bangladesh
Treaties of Barbados
Treaties of Belgium
Treaties of the Republic of Dahomey
Treaties of the military dictatorship in Brazil
Treaties of the People's Republic of Bulgaria
Treaties of Burkina Faso
Treaties of Myanmar
Treaties of the Byelorussian Soviet Socialist Republic
Treaties of Canada
Treaties of Chile
Treaties of the Republic of China (1949–1971)
Treaties of the People's Republic of China
Treaties of Cuba
Treaties of Cyprus
Treaties of Czechoslovakia
Treaties of the Czech Republic
Treaties of Denmark
Treaties of the Dominican Republic
Treaties of Ecuador
Treaties of Egypt
Treaties of El Salvador
Treaties of Fiji
Treaties of Finland
Treaties of France
Treaties of West Germany
Treaties of East Germany
Treaties of the Kingdom of Greece
Treaties of Guinea-Bissau
Treaties of the Hungarian People's Republic
Treaties of Iceland
Treaties of India
Treaties of the Iraqi Republic (1958–1968)
Treaties of Ireland
Treaties of Israel
Treaties of Italy
Treaties of Jamaica
Treaties of Japan
Treaties of Kenya
Treaties of South Korea
Treaties of Kuwait
Treaties of the Kingdom of Laos
Treaties of Lebanon
Treaties of the Kingdom of Libya
Treaties of Madagascar
Treaties of Mali
Treaties of Mauritius
Treaties of Mexico
Treaties of the Mongolian People's Republic
Treaties of Morocco
Treaties of Nepal
Treaties of the Netherlands
Treaties of New Zealand
Treaties of Niger
Treaties of Nigeria
Treaties of Norway
Treaties of Pakistan
Treaties of Papua New Guinea
Treaties of Peru
Treaties of the Polish People's Republic
Treaties of the Socialist Republic of Romania
Treaties of San Marino
Treaties of Saudi Arabia
Treaties of Seychelles
Treaties of Sierra Leone
Treaties of Singapore
Treaties of the Solomon Islands
Treaties of South Africa
Treaties of Francoist Spain
Treaties of Sri Lanka
Treaties of Sweden
Treaties of Switzerland
Treaties of Syria
Treaties of Thailand
Treaties of Tonga
Treaties of Tunisia
Treaties of Turkey
Treaties of Uganda
Treaties of the Ukrainian Soviet Socialist Republic
Treaties of the United Kingdom
Treaties of Uruguay
Treaties of Venezuela
Treaties of Vietnam
Treaties of Slovakia
Treaties of South Yemen
Treaties of Zambia
Treaties of Algeria
Treaties of North Korea
Treaties of Equatorial Guinea
Treaties of Estonia
Treaties of Indonesia
Treaties of Kazakhstan
Treaties of Luxembourg
Treaties of Portugal
Treaties of Saint Vincent and the Grenadines
Treaties of Togo
Treaties of the United Arab Emirates
Treaties extended to the Netherlands Antilles
Treaties extended to Aruba
Treaties extended to Saint Christopher-Nevis-Anguilla
Treaties extended to Jersey
Treaties extended to Guernsey
Treaties extended to the Isle of Man
Treaties extended to Greenland
Treaties extended to the Faroe Islands
Treaties extended to Bermuda
Treaties extended to the British Antarctic Territory
Treaties extended to the British Indian Ocean Territory
Treaties extended to the British Virgin Islands
Treaties extended to the Cayman Islands
Treaties extended to the Falkland Islands
Treaties extended to Gibraltar
Treaties extended to Montserrat
Treaties extended to the Pitcairn Islands
Treaties extended to Saint Helena, Ascension and Tristan da Cunha
Treaties extended to South Georgia and the South Sandwich Islands
Treaties extended to the Turks and Caicos Islands
Treaties extended to Portuguese Macau
Treaties extended to British Antigua and Barbuda
Treaties extended to the Colony of the Bahamas
Treaties extended to Brunei (protectorate)
Treaties extended to British Dominica
Treaties extended to the Colony of Fiji
Treaties extended to British Grenada
Treaties extended to British Hong Kong
Treaties extended to British Mauritius
Treaties extended to British Saint Lucia
Treaties extended to British Saint Vincent and the Grenadines
Treaties extended to the British Solomon Islands
Treaties extended to Swaziland (protectorate)
Treaties extended to the Kingdom of Tonga (1900–1970)
January 1967 events